This article concerns the period 199 BC – 190 BC.

References